Angelina M. Lopez is an American romance author living in Houston, Texas.

Her Latinx book After Hours on Milagro Street was rated a top romance novel of 2022 by The Washington Post and Entertainment Weekly The novel treats the subjects of 
gentrification and cultural assimilation.

A story by Lopez was collected in Best Women's Erotica of the Year by Simon & Schuster in 2021.

She is from a Mexican American family from southeast Kansas. She discovered romance fiction as a child in a Kansas public library.

References

21st-century American novelists
Women romantic fiction writers
21st-century American women writers
Year of birth missing (living people)
Living people
Writers from Houston
Place of birth missing (living people)
Writers from Kansas
American writers of Mexican descent
American romantic fiction novelists